Candeal is a municipality in the Brazilian state of Bahia.

References

Municipalities in Bahia